Nova Olinda may refer to:

Nova Olinda, São Tomé and Príncipe
Nova Olinda do Norte, Amazonas, Brazil
Nova Olinda, Paraíba, Brazil
Nova Olinda do Maranhão, Brazil
Nova Olinda, Ceará, Brazil